A paleoburrow is an underground shelter (tunnel, burrow, lair, etc.) excavated by extinct paleo-vertebrate megafauna (i.e., giant mammals, such as ground sloths) that lived in the prehistoric era.

A crotovina (molehill) is a paleoburrow filled with sediments (sands, clays, etc.) that have been deposited over the centuries through rainfall and accumulated due to the porosity of the terrain. Generally, fossils found in crotovinas exhibit large proportions similar to known megafauna of their geological period.

In Brazil, hundreds of paleontological sites characterized as paleoburrows exist, such as in Ponta do Abunã, in Rondônia, within the Amazon region, in the Serra do Gandarela National Park, in Minas Gerais, in Monte Bonito, the southern Rio Grande, as well as the Toca do Tatu in Santa Catarina.

After the extinction of the megafauna about 10,000 years ago, some paleoburrows were reused by indigenous human populations. Recent searches indicate that these structures were used as temporary shelters as well as for ritual purposes. In the interior of some paleoburrows, researchers discovered stone tools, ceramic artifacts, human burials, and inscriptions engraved in the walls.

Paleoburrows are classified as paleontological sites; however, if the remains of ancient populations are also found, the site may become the object of research for both paleontologists and archaeologists.

References

Further reading 
  Andrew Jenner (2017), "Get Lost in Mega-Tunnels Dug by South American Megafauna", Discover Magazine

Paleontology
Shelters built or used by animals
Paleontology in Brazil
Burrow fossils